Lee Soo-min (born 12 October 1993) is a South Korean professional golfer.

Lee won the 2013 Gunsan CC Open on the Korean Tour while still an amateur. He turned professional in 2014 and began playing regularly on the Korean Tour, winning the Gunsan CC Open again in 2015. He earned a 2015 Asian Tour card through qualifying school; as a rookie, he recorded two top-three finishes and placed 29th on the Order of Merit.

In February 2016 Lee was joint runner-up in the Maybank Championship Malaysia, an event co-sanctioned by the European Tour and the Asian Tour. In April he won the European Tour's Shenzhen International on a sponsor exemption, giving him full European Tour membership. Two weeks later he lost in a playoff for the GS Caltex Maekyung Open, a Korean Tour/OneAsia Tour event, a result that lifted him to a career-high 68 in the world rankings.

Amateur wins
2012 Korean Amateur – Hur Chungkoo Cup

Professional wins (5)

European Tour wins (1)

Korean Tour wins (4)

Playoff record
OneAsia Tour playoff record (0–1)

Results in major championships

CUT = missed the half-way cut
"T" = tied

Team appearances
Amateur
Bonallack Trophy (representing Asia/Pacific): 2012, 2014
Eisenhower Trophy (representing South Korea): 2012

References

External links

South Korean male golfers
European Tour golfers
Sportspeople from Gangwon Province, South Korea
1993 births
Living people